Gwilym Arifor Prichard (né Pritchard; 4 March 1931 – 7 June 2015) was a Welsh landscape painter.

Early life
Born in the village of Llanystumdwy, near Criccieth, Gwynedd, he studied at Bangor Normal College (1951-3) before moving on to Birmingham College of Art, before becoming a teacher in Anglesey.  He married fellow artist Claudia Williams in 1953, and altered the spelling of his surname when he discovered that there was another painter of the same name. Their son, Ceri Pritchard, is a painter.

Style
Noted for his "dramatic and colourful" depictions of "dense, craggy, often formidable landscapes" with "a three-dimensional quality", Prichard's paintings "managed to display his joy in the richness and beauty of his native land".  He started to become successful during the 1960s, and in 1970 he was  elected to the Royal Cambrian Academy.

Professional life
After leaving paid employment in the early 1970s, he became a full-time painter.  In the early 1980s the couple began travelling through Europe, living for periods in Skiathos, Greece and Rochefort-en-Terre, Brittany, before settling in Pembrokeshire in 1999.  Prichard was awarded the Silver Medal by the Société Académique des Arts-Sciences-Lettres de Paris in 1995, and was an Honorary Fellow of the University of Wales.  In later years he was regarded as the senior living Welsh landscape painter.  A major exhibition of his work was held in Cardiff in 2013, and a monograph detailing his work, A Lifetime's Gazing, was published the same year.

Death
Prichard died at his home in Tenby June 7, 2015.

References

1931 births
2015 deaths
20th-century Welsh painters
20th-century Welsh male artists
21st-century Welsh painters
21st-century Welsh male artists
People associated with the University of Wales
People from Caernarfonshire
Welsh landscape painters
Welsh male painters